Parma Associazione Calcio played its third consecutive season in Serie A, and had arguably its best ever season, even when considering its glorious years in the late 1990s. It finished third in the domestic league competition and won the UEFA Cup Winners' Cup following a 3–1 final victory against Royal Antwerp.

Players

Goalkeepers
  Cláudio Taffarel
  Marco Ballotta
  Marco Ferrari

Defenders
  Antonio Benarrivo
  Alberto Di Chiara
  Lorenzo Minotti
  Luigi Apolloni
  Georges Grün
  Stefano Nava
  Cornelio Donati
  Salvatore Matrecano
  Gianluca Franchini

Midfielders
  Tomas Brolin
  Daniele Zoratto
  Stefano Cuoghi
  Gabriele Pin
  Ivo Pulga
  Sergio Berti
  Marco Osio
  Fausto Pizzi
  Aldo Monza

Forwards
  Faustino Asprilla
  Giovanni Sorce
  Alessandro Melli
  Gianluca Hervatin

Competitions

Serie A

League table

Matches

Coppa Italia

Second round

Round of 16

Quarter-finals

Supercoppa Italiana

European Cup Winners' Cup

First round

Second round

Quarter-finals

Semi-finals

Final

Statistics

Goalscorers
  Alessandro Melli 12
  Marco Osio 7
  Faustino Asprilla 7
  Fausto Pizzi 5
  Tomas Brolin 4

References

Parma Calcio 1913 seasons
Parma
UEFA Cup Winners' Cup-winning seasons